New Ideas in Psychology is a quarterly peer-reviewed scientific journal covering theoretical psychology. It was established in 1983 and is published by the Elsevier imprint Pergamon Press. The editor-in-chief is Bennett L. Schwartz (Florida International University). According to the Journal Citation Reports, the journal has a 2017 impact factor of 1.367.

References

External links

Psychology journals
Quarterly journals
Publications established in 1983
Elsevier academic journals
English-language journals